In Greek mythology, the name Amphinome (Ancient Greek: Ἀμφινόμη means 'she of the surrounding pasture') may refer to the following deity and women:
 Amphinome, the Nereid who feeds Poseidon's flock. As one of the 50 marine-nymphs, she was a daughter of the 'Old Man of the Sea' Nereus and the Oceanid Doris.  Amphinome and her other sisters appeared to Thetis when she cries out in sympathy for the grief of Achilles for his slain friend Patroclus.
 Amphinome, wife of Aeson, King of Iolcus. She was the mother to Jason and Promachus, Aeson's sons. She and her husband were persecuted by king Pelias of Iolcus. After Pelias had killed her husband and younger son, Amphinome stabbed herself with a sword. As she lay dying she pronounced a curse against the king. Otherwise, the mother of the hero was called Polymele, Polymede or Polypheme, Theognete, daughter of Laodicus, Rhoeo, Arne or Scarphe.
 Amphinome, one of the Peliades, daughters of Pelias and sister of Alcestis and Evadne. She was given by Jason in marriage to Andraemon, brother of Leonteus.
 Amphinome, wife of Arizelus and mother of Harpalion.

Notes

References 

 Apollodorus, The Library with an English Translation by Sir James George Frazer, F.B.A., F.R.S. in 2 Volumes, Cambridge, MA, Harvard University Press; London, William Heinemann Ltd. 1921. ISBN 0-674-99135-4. Online version at the Perseus Digital Library. Greek text available from the same website.
Diodorus Siculus, The Library of History translated by Charles Henry Oldfather. Twelve volumes. Loeb Classical Library. Cambridge, Massachusetts: Harvard University Press; London: William Heinemann, Ltd. 1989. Vol. 3. Books 4.59–8. Online version at Bill Thayer's Web Site
 Diodorus Siculus, Bibliotheca Historica. Vol 1-2. Immanel Bekker. Ludwig Dindorf. Friedrich Vogel. in aedibus B. G. Teubneri. Leipzig. 1888-1890. Greek text available at the Perseus Digital Library.
 Hesiod, Catalogue of Women from Homeric Hymns, Epic Cycle, Homerica translated by Evelyn-White, H G. Loeb Classical Library Volume 57. London: William Heinemann, 1914. Online version at theio.com
Homer, The Iliad with an English Translation by A.T. Murray, Ph.D. in two volumes. Cambridge, MA., Harvard University Press; London, William Heinemann, Ltd. 1924. . Online version at the Perseus Digital Library.
Homer, Homeri Opera in five volumes. Oxford, Oxford University Press. 1920. . Greek text available at the Perseus Digital Library.
Quintus Smyrnaeus, The Fall of Troy translated by Way. A. S. Loeb Classical Library Volume 19. London: William Heinemann, 1913. Online version at theio.com
 Quintus Smyrnaeus, The Fall of Troy. Arthur S. Way. London: William Heinemann; New York: G.P. Putnam's Sons. 1913. Greek text available at the Perseus Digital Library.
Tzetzes, John, Book of Histories, Book V-VI translated by Konstantinos Ramiotis from the original Greek of T. Kiessling's edition of 1826.  Online version at theio.com.
Smith, William. Dictionary of Greek and Roman Biography and Mythology, London: Taylor, Walton, and Maberly (1873). "Amphinome"

Nereids
Queens in Greek mythology
Princesses in Greek mythology
Deities in the Iliad
Characters from Iolcus
Suicides in Greek mythology